A management contract is an arrangement under which operational control of an enterprise is vested by contract in a separate enterprise that performs the necessary managerial functions in return for a fee. Management contracts involve not just selling a method of doing things (as with franchising or licensing) but involve actually doing them. A management contract can involve a wide range of functions, such as technical operation and of a production facility, management of personnel, accounting, marketing services and training.

In Asia, many hotels operate under management contract arrangements, as they can more easily obtain economies of scale, global reservation systems, brand recognition etc. It is not unusual for contracts to be signed for 30 years, and have a fee as high as 3.5% of total revenues and 6–10% of gross operating profit. Management contracts have been used to a wide extent in the airline industry, and when foreign government action restricts other entry methods. Management contracts are often formed where there is a lack of local skills to run a project. It is an alternative to foreign direct investment as it does not involve as high risk and can yield higher returns for the company. The first recorded management contract was initiated by Qantas and Duncan Upton in 1978.

Difference between management contract and franchising  

In business management, franchising is a contractual relationship between franchiser (owner of the company) and franchisee (buyer of a brand name). The franchiser allows the franchisee to use its trademark along with certain business systems and processes in exchange for a fee.

Business students usually get confused between the concepts of management contracts and franchising. Although they have much in common, such as they both earn by selling intangibles and are both affiliated with another company, but where a management contract acts as a framework and provides formation and structure to the company and its members, franchisees remain independent.

Advantages and disadvantages 

A businessman who owns several companies, cannot distribute his attention to every minute detail of his company. He needs some expert assistance with his work so he can concentrate on broader aspects. This assistance can be provided by contract management companies. On hiring such companies, the owner will have more time to concentrate on the expansion of the business rather than day-to-day working of the companies. The businessman can distribute some of his basic responsibilities to these management companies such as recruitment, deployment and retention.

There are several companies that cannot reach the peak of success due to a lack of expertise in one field or another. Such companies should hire contract management teams. This way they would not just be hiring an experienced employee but an entire team of efficient and experienced employees in technical fields of management, accountancy, marketing etc.

Management contracts give businessmen an assurance of the continuity of their business. This can be illustrated through an example. A manager or any employee may terminate his job, leaving the business a hole in its team for the smooth functioning of the operations. A contract management company can easily change few employees without stirring the constancy of the business model.

Through management contracts, a businessman can venture into international business opportunities without taking a huge risk of putting his own physical assets at stake. For example, the Heathrow Airport Holdings Limited of Britain retains general airport management skills. In the EEUU Heathrow serves the Indianapolis Airport under a 10 years management contract. It also provides retail management at the air mall in the Pittsburgh Airport.

The government uses management contracts for the progress and development of the skill of the local managers and workers. They also accolade management contract companies to upgrade and operate public utilities.

Entering into a management contract might lead to difficulties and problems for the business owners. By entering into such agreements businesses are risking their privacy. When a businessman handover his company's management to a third party, he may enter into confidential disputes. These contracts make the business expose to ethical breaches, fraud and public exposure. The information of the other contracts made by the business is also available to the management contract companies. Since their responsibilities range from price negotiation to stock control they have full information about the vendors. Management responsibilities includes record of all employees, their personal information and payments procedures. Management contract companies have information on business finance also. This puts the business in a vulnerable position.

Hiring an outside contractor makes it difficult for the business to foresee the number of conflicts that can occur. For example, a businessman hires a contract management company for the operations of the company. The management company may in turn take on the management of the supplier's company too. This can lead to several compromises in the discounts, price negotiations and suppliers way of working. There can be even more conflicts even the same management company handles the management of several competitors at same time.

International management can be very risky for management companies. If a country is going through political or social turmoil, the manager's life is put at risk to carry on the business in such a situation.

Some popular types of management contracts

Hotel management contracts

Overview 
Hotel management contract is a written agreement between the owner and the operator of the hotel. The base of this relationship is that the operator handles the day-to-day working of the hotel and takes up all the additional responsibilities such as maintenance, front office, housekeeping, handling food and beverages and sale. The management contract company has the power to recruit and fire the employees. The owner will authorize and pay for the capital project of the hotel but the responsibility of it is assigned to the operator.
The hotel management contracts can be lengthy and complicated. The negotiation of this agreement focusing the power of the owner and the rights of the operator. The initial draft is offered by the prospective operator. It usually is in favor of the operator so that operator can seek a long-term contract. It doesn't want any interference from the owner but at the same time wants continuous supply of investment for the expansion and growth of the project.

Purpose of this contract 
The main purpose of this agreement is that the investors of some hotels lack the skill and knowledge of operating them. They are mere businessman with good financial status. They lack experience or expertise in such field. Therefore, they need the assistance of such management companies who can get the output of their investment.

Major elements of the contract  
 Terms and conditions of the agreement
 Length and durability of the agreement
 Procedure for early termination by either party of the contract
 Insurance policies of the hotel and its fixed assets.
 Management company ownership or investment required
 Contract terms in the event of sale of the hotel
 Incentive fees earned or penalties assessed related to operating performance
 The exclusivity of the management company
 Status of the employees

Construction management contracts

Overview 
Construction management contract is between the investor and the builder. This is for use on construction projects. This contract is usually appointed by the client (investor) in the early stage. The relationship between the client and the management contractor usually covers both the work of pre-construction and construction activities. The management contractor is responsible for all the administrative and operational work of the construction project. The investor usually comes in the picture to hire the management contractor and then when the building of the project is complete. The entire work in between these two events is done by the management contractor.

The managing contractor is responsible for sub-contract claims arising from its own inadequate performance. It the elements to be included in a project, and the design of those elements, with the management expertise of a contractor organization to assist and advise in developing the design, coordinating the interface between design and construction, undertaking the construction and planning for and remaining within a target cost and target time for delivery of the project.

Advantages 
Advantages of construction agreements are:
	This agreement is most beneficial when little guidance or information is available in the initial stage of the project while the project is complicated and complex.
	The management contractor acts as a consultant in the early stage of building.
	The investor has to pay a single management team rather than several contractors and workers.
	Management contracts fix the price of building the project enabling the investor to calculate its finance and profit
	This enables experts to control the design, quality, cost of material used in early stages.
	The scope of making the project in accordance to the preference of customers is high.

Disadvantages 
Disadvantages of construction agreements are:
	High risk of conflicts between the manager and the investor.
	The price is fixed in advance which may change from time due to change economy resulting in conflicts between the investor and manager.

See also
Outsourcing

References

Strategic alliances
Foreign direct investment
Contract law